Charles Woodruff House is a historic building in Wyoming, Ohio, United States.  It was listed on the National Register of Historic Places on August 25, 1986.

Historic uses 
Single dwelling

Notes 

Houses on the National Register of Historic Places in Ohio
Houses in Wyoming, Ohio
National Register of Historic Places in Hamilton County, Ohio